Holy Trinity University (HTU) (ቅድስት ሥላሴ ዩኒቨርሲቲ) is a theological university located in Addis Ababa, Ethiopia. It provides religious and theological instruction to both clergy and lay members of the Ethiopian Orthodox Tewahedo Church. The institution also aims to serve as a center of theological and ecclesiastical study for all Oriental Orthodox Churches.

References

Ethiopian Orthodox Tewahedo church buildings
Universities and colleges in Ethiopia
Christian schools in Ethiopia
Education in Addis Ababa
Educational institutions established in 1942
Educational institutions established in 1960
1942 establishments in Ethiopia